Archena is a municipality of Spain in the autonomous community and province of Murcia and is located in the northeastern quarter.

Archena is home to a hot water mineral spa dating back to Roman times and has 3 hotels built around it.  Whilst undergoing recent development, further Roman ruins were found on the site of the spa.

Etymology 
The etymology of the word "Archena" is indisputably somehow related to the Indo-European root referring to "water" that appears in Arga, Erga, Arganzuela, etc., and, within the territory of Murcia, with the Argos river, Archena, Archivel, etc. The origin of the word "Archena" derives from Latin arxila, which means clay, but over the years it turned into "Archena".

History

Roman Times 

Although the village of Archena was created in the Bronze Age, the Romans were the ones who founded the town in the 1st and 2nd centuries. This is shown in the archeological remains of the therms in Archena's water spa. The Romans created around this place temples, lodges, paths and roads connected with the rest of Hispania.

17th century 
With the conquest of the Nasrid kingdom of Granada by the Catholic Monarchs in 1492, the Christian Reconquest of the Iberian Peninsula ended. Like the rest of the Kingdom of Murcia and the territories of the Iberian Peninsula, the seventeenth century is a period of crisis for Archena for several reasons. This century saw a demographic increase and a development of the cultivated surface, being rice, corn, oil and barley the most important productions at that time. Later, a demographic decrease was magnified by a series of catastrophes that devastated the region: floods, droughts, locust plagues, earthquakes and plagues.

18th century 
The 18th century was a period of stability and economic progress for all the country, especially for the Murcia's area. The Ricote Valley and Archena were the zones with the greatest population growth.

In this century Archena suffered negative economic effects since a company of French troops remained stationed there, which meant a high cost to the town. However, the century of the Enlightenment is for the municipality the beginning of an upward trajectory from the demographic point of view, which lasts until today.

19th century 
The Independence War caused a deep wear in the "Balneario". Later, a period of political instability and civil conflict started. With the definitive victory of liberalism, the Ancien Régime’s abolition was produced. The political and social tensions which the Restauration pretended to hide, burst uncontrollably in the second decade of the 20th century and finished in the long Civil War.

20th century 
Archena had got a little sanatorium thanks to Mr. Mario Spreáfico, a doctor who helped poor people for free. Archena had also got the figure of Vicente Medina, a great naturalist poet who spent most of his life away from the village but who loved and appreciated its orchards.

The trade, the agriculture and the industry prospered. In the first years of the century, the factory "Molinos del río" was set up.  The apricot was the most important fruit but, in general, there was also an important production of citrus. Nowadays, there are some chimneys left as a trace of this industrial activity.

Spanish Civil War 

During the Spanish Civil War, two military bases were established in Archena: a Soviet air base a police station and tank school in the "Balneario" and Military Hospital.

The Military Command settled in the Miguel Medina school.  Archena didn't suffer attacks during the war, but suffered the long and hard postwar. The battle reduced the development again, returning to a subsistence production. After the war, life conditions were very hard, with the decrease of the salaries and the subsequent famines.

The repression included some murders and the harassment of many people (women, children...), and meant the prison for the republicans. In April 1939 the municipal officials were destituted.

Second half of the century 
After the Spanish Civil War, the "Virgen de la Salud" and the "Corpus Christi" were turned into patron saints of Archena. By the thirties of the 20th century, in Archena there was a population of 7.771, in spite of the emigration to France or Barcelona, which lasted until the eighties when, with the prosperity of the economy, some emigrants returned. From that time on, the population in Archena started to grow.

On 1 September 1963, there was an explosion of an ammunition depot at the distance of one kilometer from the village. Nowadays, people in Archena celebrate that there weren't any deaths or wounds.

In 1975, when the dictator Francisco Franco died, a term of politic transition started. In this period, the government created new schools, health, cultural and sports installations.

21st century 
Thanks to archaeological excavations in 2001, a cave was found dating back to c.2300 BC, in Copper Age, used by a community of 23 people.

On 11 September 2012, the 550th anniversary of Archena's township was celebrated. On 11 September, 1462, the Order of Saint John of Jerusalem signed the municipal charter with a few villagers; these people reached the independence of Archena as a municipality with the constitution of the first local government and the first mayor.

The church of the Corpus Christi-La Purísima was created in 2001 thanks to a priest of the church San Juan Bautista, D. Cristóbal Guerrero Ros. He said that Archena needed a second church and with the support of some people, he collected money for the construction. On 31 May 2001, Cristobal Guerrero Ros was named "adopted son of the village". On 26 April 2010, he received a tribute.

A group of ruins have been found in the spa thanks to the construction of the new parking. Since then, the spa management has found Roman columns in the thermal gallery. Moreover, Roman ruins of buildings have appeared in the pool area, where what today would have been a hotel. There is a museum to save these ruins.

Geography

Geography 
Archena is 24 km away from Murcia. The municipal term has a 16,5 km2 surface, the large majority being irrigated land. It is one of the towns in the Ricote Valley. The Segura river, which runs through 7 km along the Archena's municipal area, constitutes its main axis.

The Archena's surface is slightly undulating, with two mounds, the highest of them (in the north) called Ope, and the other being the Sierra de la Serrata.

Weather 
Archena has a dry Mediterranean climate. There is not a lot of rain during the whole year. According to Köpen and Geiger, this climate is classified as a BSk. The average annual temperature is 17.7 °C.

Winters are soft and summers are hot, January is the coldest month, the temperatures ranging between 4.5 °C and 13.3 °C. August is the warmest month of the year, when the temperature ranges between 9.9 °C and 26.3 °C, although temperatures can surpass 40 °C in summer and fall below 0 °C in winter.

Regarding rainfall, the average annual accumulation is 297 mm. The driest month is July, with 3 mm of rain. In October, the precipitations reach its peak, with an average of 47 mm. The precipitations concentrate on few days, mainly in Autumn. Snow is extraordinarily rare in Murcia and in Archena it almost never snows.

There is a difference of 44 mm of precipitation between the driest and the wettest months. The variation in annual temperature is around 16.4 °C.

Environs 
Archena is the main city in the Ricote Valley area. Other towns and villages in this area are:

 Ulea is a Spanish municipality that belongs to the Ricote Valley area; its extension is 42.5 square kilometers and it has a population of 913 inhabitants.
 Villanueva del Río Segura is a Spanish municipality of the Region of Murcia, located in the heart of the Ricote Valley. Its population is 2.650 inhabitants and it has an area of 13,18 square kilometers.
 Ojós is a Spanish municipality of the Region of Murcia that is located in the area of the Ricote Valley. It has 504 inhabitants and its extension is 42.28 square kilometers.

Neighbourhoods

Barrio de la Providencia 
The occupation of this populous neighbourhood, only surpassed by La Algaida in number of inhabitants, dates back from the early 20th century, when it was known as Camino de la Paira. The Duque de Huete football field was built in there, and over it the area was urbanised. Due to this, the neighbourhood is informally known as "el fútbol" ("the football").

El Hurtado 
In this neighbourhood, entrepreneurs settled forming a small inhabited centre, known as "El Hurtado". The name comes from the family of owners were surnamed Hurtado.

Las Arboledas 
Las Arboledas (meaning "the groves") is a small neighbourhood which takes part in the common history of the town. The patron saint of this entity is the Virgin of Lourdes. Las Arboledas festivities take place, as El Hurtado, in honour of Apostle James.

El Otro Lao 
This neighbourhood (meaning "the other side") dates back to the last years of the 19th century. A completely unavoidable family in its history is the Spreáfico family. The famous Castle of Don Mario is placed in this area.

Los Baños 
Los Baños ("the baths") is one of the most popular districts of Archena. The history of this neighbourhood began centuries ago. Nowadays, they are an integrated area in the urban part of Archena; a hotel complex which manages the operation of the thermal springs and offers to the visitor services dedicated to health and beauty.

La Algaida 
La Algaida is the most important core of population apart from the town itself. Its patron saint is Our Lady of the Rosary. In 1900, it became momentarily famous when the rumours spread that a woman known as "La Quica" had visions in which the Virgin appeared.

Torre del Junco 
This district is stuck to La Algaida, with which it has a great link. Torre del Junco was always part of La Algaida, being one of the largest and most recognized areas by their abundant crops.

Infrastructures

Streets 

The best-known and busiest streets in Archena are Ramón y Cajal St., where there are many shops; Primero de Mayo Av.; Copenhague St., where the water spa is, and which is usually used for running; and Noria St., where the Plaza de Abastos is.

Access roads 
There are a few ways to come to Archena: A-7, A-30, RM-533, RM-554 and N-301. The following roads communicate Archena with the surrounding towns and villages: MU-533 goes from Archena to Ceutí, RM-530 goes from to Mula, RM-522 leads to Ojós, RM-533 goes from Archena to Alguazas and RM-544 goes from the highway A-30 to Archena, connecting it to Murcia.

Transport 
Archena has got a bus stop and a taxi stand, that is situated in Archena's city centre. Also, there is a train station between Archena and Fortuna. This train station is situated in the Campotejar district, with Archena to the west and Fortuna to the east. Archena has, in total, forty-eight enterprises related to the transport of goods or people.

Recreational structures 
There are many parks in Archena, the most important being the one next to Plaza Primero de Mayo. Also noteworthy are Archena picnic, the Segura River promenade, the Noria by Matías Martínez, the Acebuches Noria, the José Alcolea Lacal Park and the Paira Park.

Local Council 
In the past, the town hall was located in a different building. Nowadays, the Casa Grande (Big House) is the house of the local council, built by the Order of St. John in the 15th century as the Casa de la Tercia ("Tercia's House"), in renaissance style.

By 2018, the municipal corporation is made of:

 The Popular Municipal Group (PP): with Mrs. Patricia Fernández López, Archena's current mayor, and their corresponding city councillors: one for education and equality areas; another one for taxes, security, agriculture, and water supplies areas; another one for tourism, assistance to the locals, and neighbourhood addressing areas; another one for human resources, administration, services, sports, and healthcare areas; another one for family, social well-being and trade areas; another one for urban planning, and industry areas; another one for elderly people; another one for culture, municipality estataed, festivities, and sustainable development areas; and another one for youth and local development areas. 
 The Socialist Municipal Group (PSOE): formed by five councillors.
 The "Unidas Podemos" Municipal Group: formed by two councillors.
 The “Vox" Municipal Group: formed by one councillor.

Landmarks

Spa 
The Balneario de Archena water spa is the best known place of the town. The spa has three hotels, aesthetic and relax centres and ceremonial halls. The Thermal Space of the spa has got a 3.000 m surface surrounded by a natural landscape next to the Segura river, and it includes swimming pools, Jacuzzis, waterfalls and installations for children.

Local Museum 
The local museum has a modernist style. In the museum, the archaeological and historical rests of the town can be found. Besides, it has a room for temporal exhibitions for showing other parts of its rich history. It is near the Monte del Tío Pío, which is popular for its rich archaeological sites. The tourist office can also be found here.

Esparto Museum 
The Esparto Museum is in the Palazzo of Villarría's basement. Pieces made with esparto of Archena's buildings replicas and tools of Archena's orchards can be visited here.

Don Mario's Castle 
Don Mario's Castle has this name because its owner used to be Mario Spreáfico, a loved doctor who helped poor people in the town. This building has a fortress shape and its structure is made of a prism with cylinders in the corners. Nowadays, it is privately owned. It is located at the outskirts of the urban centre, on the top of a little hill.

The Ope 
The Ope is the best-known and highest (276 meters) hill located in the north of the town. It is the most representative and symbolic of the mountains that surround Archena. Its summit, crowned with a cross, is perfectly recognizable everywhere in the town. Its cross exists since the 17th century; before, it was made of wood, but nowadays is made of iron. There is a legend that explains why it is necessary to protect the Ope. Walking up to the cross of the Ope is a very popular activity among the people who live in Archena and also among the tourists, as they are able to enjoy a beautiful view of the town and the Ricote Valley. In the first half of the route there is a path to walk, and the remaining half has to be done by climbing.

Demography 
Archena has a total of 19,428 inhabitants. To be more exact, 9,223 women and 10,205 men.

This town has suffered an upward progress since 1900 until 2008 (with 54% more population), and every year it goes on.

In Archena there are 15,968 Spaniards and 3,460 foreigners (351 Europeans, 1,755 Africans, 1,309 Americans and 44 Asians) according to 2020 statistics. A total of 74 marriages took place in 2019. These are some 2019 statistics:

 Marriage rate: 3.37
 Birth rate: 9.66
 Mortality rate: 7.88
 Vegetative growth rate: 1.79

Historical Evolution

Evolution from 1900 to 2017 
According to data published by the INE on 1 January 2017, the number of inhabitants in Archena was 18.771, 37 more than in 2016. In this table we can see the evolution of the number of men, women and total population over the years.

YEAR MEN WOMEN TOTAL

Maximum Seasonal Population 
The maximum seasonal population is an estimate of the maximum population that Archena supports. The calculation includes people who have some kind of relationship with the municipality, either because they live, work, and study or spend some time in it.

Inhabitants by place of birth 
According to data published by the INE from the 2017 municipal census, 58.39% (10,961) of the inhabitants registered in the municipality of Archena were born there, 22.82% migrated to Archena from different parts of Spain, 16.75% (3,145) from other municipalities in the province of Murcia, 6.06% (1,138) from other autonomous communities and 18.79% (3,527) migrated to Archena from other countries.

If we compare the census from 1996 until 2017:

 The number of inhabitants born in Archena increased (346), from 58.39% to 74.95%. 
 The number of inhabitants born in the province of Murcia increased (668), from 16.75% to 17.49%. 
 The number of inhabitants born in the rest of Spain increased (274), from 6.06% to 6.10%. 
 The number of people born in other countries increased (3,320), from 1.46% to 18.79%.

Education 
In the town of Archena there are a public nursery, "Los Colorines" and a private one, "Pequeñines". There are six public school with pre-school and primary education: CEIP Río Segura, CEIP Emilio Candel, CEIP José Alcolea Lacal, CEIP Micaela Sanz, CEIP Miguel Medina and CEIP N Sra. de la Fuensanta, belonging to the La Algaida district. In relation to secondary schools, there are two public centres with compulsory secondary education, bachillerato and vocational training degrees: IES Vicente Medina and IES Dr. Pedro Guillén, the latter placed in the neighbourhood El Otro Lao, belonging to the district of "La Algaida". Archena also counts with one semi-private school, "El Ope", that offers kindergarten, pre-school, primary and secondary education and vocational training.

Culture

Festivities 

In June, the Corpus Christi festivities begin, in which various offerings are made to the Virgen de la Salud and there is usually a pilgrimage. On the Corpus Christi day, there are carpets made with coloured salt with different motives. In the last years, a "Moros y cristianos" march has been celebrated. During the festivities, there is also a day for paellas and another for gachas migas. On 1 September starts another festivity called "El Polvorín" ("the ammunition dump"). This festivity celebrates that in 1963 there were no deaths after an explosion in a warehouse with military explosives that left many material damages.

Local Museum 
In addition, next to the Plaza Primero de Mayo, there used to be an esparto museum, though nowadays there is a museum of "Moros y Cristianos".

Groups and Cultural Associations 
There are cultural groups such as the Grupo Folklórico Virgen de la Salud, Grupo Rociero Aires Andaluces and Belén Viviente (which also meets in the Plaza 1 de Mayo) and cultural associations such as Villa de Archena, which is a literary association, and Archena Rociera, which is a cultural association.

Health 
The most important health center is called Mario Spreáfico. The new health center was inaugurated on 20 March 2002, and there are currently several services: pediatrics, infirmary, dentistry and physiotherapy among others. It also has a certain programmes aimed at different ages of the population such as child care programme, programme for the attention of women and adult and elderly care programme. The outpatients clinic in La Algaida (a district in Archena) is another health centre in the town.

There are five pharmacies distributed throughout the town: Fuentes Ayala, C., López Atenza, V.J., Martínez Carrillo, M.D., Peña Llorens, P., and the pharmacy in La Algaida: Gómez Carrasco.

Economy 

The main source of wealth in Archena is agriculture: 1.403 hectares of the town are used as farming lands where fruit trees predominate. The second source of income is industry: Archena has an industrial estate called "La Capellanía", where most of the companies work in manufacture, trade and rebuilding. A third source of income is tourism: Archena has representative examples of cultural heritage such a museums, churches, a theatre, etc. But doubtless the most important source of tourism is the Balneario de Archena water spa, which is 2.000 years old and offers its thermal waters to its visitors. It is probably the most popular place in Archena.

The number of unemployed people in 2018 is 1.221, having descended since the previous year.

Sports 
Archena is town with a lot of variety of sports and buildings for doing them.

Sport centre 

There are also two tennis courts, a futsal court, a multi-use pavilion used for futsal, basketball and rhythmic gymnastics, taekwondo and full contact, a heated swimming pool to swim all the year except in summer, when the municipal pool is used instead, and finally a fronton court.

José Alcolea Lacal School 
The pavillon of this school is used as a training place for the Athletics Club, basketball and rhythmic gymnastics.

Private gyms 
There are five private-owned gyms in Archena: 1956 Gym, Dorian Gym, FunctionalFit, BodyFitness and Gimnasio ELITE. All of them have a big variety of training machines.

People from Archena 

In Archena there are not many celebrities because it is a small town, but these are some of the most famous people from Archena:

Pablo Enríquez 
A Cuban patriot who couldn't go to fight for the independence because of a heart illness. Thus, he decided to organise expeditions with humanitarian aid, but someone denounced him and he had to escape to Archena for avoiding being found.

Pedro Guillén 
Dr. Pedro Guillén is considered one of the best specialists in sport's medicine. He studied at the Complutense University of Madrid. In 1996, he carried out his first knee implant. He has a lot of medals and prizes, some of them are:

 National Prize for Investigation in Sport Medicine by the University of Oviedo (2007).
Doctor Honoris Causa by The Constantinian University (2004)
Golden medal of the Region de Murcia (June 2000).

Vicente Medina 
He was a Spanish poet and dramatist from the late 19th century. His main work, Aires murcianos, was a reference job of the sentimental costumbrismo and social criticism. He wrote around 20 poetry books and 4 theatrical dramas. He was praised by contemporary writers like Azorín.

Security 
In Archena there are a Civil Guard barracks and a group of Civil defense, composed by voluntary citizens. It owns two four-wheel drive vehicles, a patrol car, two motorcycles for forest vigilance and two patrol motorcycles for road vigilance. It consists of four divisions:

 Rescue, City and Traffic 
 Rescue, Sanitary and First Aids 
 Rescue, Countryside and Environment 
 Rescue and Help in case of Fires

They are only used in case of emergencies, natural or deliberate catastrophes, or in events that, for a great civil gathering, are needed by the competent authorities.

Symbols

Flag 
Taken from the colours of the shield, the flag is red and yellow. These are the colours of Aragon's flag, which symbolize generosity, virtue and quality. Finally, in the middle is the coat of arms of Archena.

Coat of arms 
The coat of arms of Archena is divided in two parts. The top part is formed by the red and yellow bars characteristic of the Aragon's Crown. In the middle there is a horizontal strip that cuts the coat of arms in two-halves. At the bottom, there are several figures placed overa blue blackground: a golden sun and a silver moon, placed in the middle. The moon is under the sun, and in the sides there are two crosses of Malta, also in silver colour. The moon is growing, with the tips pointing up, and the sun is represented by a circle surrounded by 16 rays, which means truth, abundance, wealth, liberality and benevolence.
Around the coat of arms there is a laurel wreath which symbolizes victory. At the top of the coat of arms there is the royal crown, composed by 8 acanthus leaf florets and 5 pearls. Finally, in the lower part of the coat of arms there is the slogan; "Muy noble y muy leal", (Very noble and very loyal).

Hymn 
On 25 July 2002, Archena's hymn, composed by Emilio Candel, was officially approved. At first, this piece of music was only for piano, but the teacher Antonio Ginés Abellán has adapted it to many instruments.

Twin towns and sister cities 
Archena is related to the town of Chesham since March 1995. Chesham is placed to the south-east of the county of Buckinghamshire. It is well communicated with the northwest of London. In addition, it is the last station of the underground that departs from London through the Metropolitan line. Together with other cities like Amersham, Rickmansworth, Watford, Hemel Hempstead, Berkhamsted, High Wycombe and Slough, they form the Valley of the Chess, name of the river that crosses this region. The hills that surround all this zone receive the name of Chiltern Hills. This city has approximately 21,176 inhabitants and an extension of 14.11 square kilometres.

References 

Municipalities in the Region of Murcia